The 2022 Central Valley Fuego FC season will be the first season in the club's existence.  It marks the return of professional soccer to Fresno since USL Championship club Fresno FC dissolved in October 2019. The club will play its first season in USL League One in the third division of the American soccer pyramid. They will play their home games at Fresno State Soccer Stadium on the campus of Fresno State University.

Jaime Ramirez, initially named the team's sporting director, was later named the head coach in late December. He would resign his position in the preseason, and was replaced by Milton Blanco in the interim. Martín Vásquez was named the permanent head coach on April 14.

Club

Roster

Competitions

Exhibitions

USL League One

Standings

Match results

U.S. Open Cup 

Fuego FC made their Open Cup debut in the Second Round.

References

Central Valley Fuego FC
Central Valley Fuego FC
Central Valley Fuego FC